Piano Bar is the third studio album by Argentine musician Charly García. It was released in 1984 and recorded in Buenos Aires. Rolling Stone Argentina listed it as the 12th best Argentine rock album.

References

Charly García albums
1984 albums